Yanesha may refer to:

Yanesha people, an indigenous people of Peru
Yanesha language, their language
Yanesha Communal Reservation